Amorosi is a comune (municipality) in the Province of Benevento in the Italian region Campania, located about 45 km northeast of Naples and about 30 km northwest of Benevento. As of 1 January 2020, it had a population of 2,709 and an area of 11.0 km2.

Amorosi borders the following municipalities: Castel Campagnano, Melizzano, Puglianello, Ruviano, San Salvatore Telesino and Telese Terme.

Demographic evolution

References

Cities and towns in Campania
Articles which contain graphical timelines